Myriam Baverel (born 14 January 1981) is a French taekwondo practitioner and Olympic medalist. She competed at the 2004 Summer Olympics in Athens, where she received a silver medal in the +67 kg class. She reached the quarterfinals at the 2000 Summer Olympics in Sydney.

Baverel received a silver medal at the 2003 World Taekwondo Championships in Garmisch Partenkirchen. Baverel announced in 2012 that she was pregnant with her first child.

References

1981 births
Living people
French female taekwondo practitioners
Taekwondo practitioners at the 2004 Summer Olympics
Olympic silver medalists for France
Olympic taekwondo practitioners of France
Sportspeople from Chambéry
Olympic medalists in taekwondo
Medalists at the 2004 Summer Olympics
World Taekwondo Championships medalists
21st-century French women